The 1997/98 NTFL season was the 77th season of the Northern Territory Football League (NTFL).

Southern Districts have claimed their first ever title defeating the NTFL's powerhouse team, St Marys by 25 points in the grand final.

Grand Final

References

Northern Territory Football League seasons
NTFL